The following is a list of football stadiums in Lebanon, ranked in descending order of capacity. Prior to the start of each Lebanese Premier League season, every team chooses two stadiums as their home venues. In case both stadiums are unavailable for a certain matchday, another venue is used.

Stadiums

See also
List of association football stadiums by capacity
List of Asian stadiums by capacity

References

 
Lebanon
Stadiums
Football stadiums